Theodore Charles Jourdan (September 5, 1895 – September 23, 1961) was a professional baseball player.  He was a first baseman over parts of four seasons (1916–1918, 1920) with the Chicago White Sox.  For his career, he compiled a .214 batting average in 196 at-bats, with 11 runs batted in.

He was born and later died in New Orleans, Louisiana at the age of 66.

External links

1895 births
1961 deaths
Baseball players from New Orleans
Birmingham Barons players
Chicago White Sox players
Dallas Steers players
Jersey City Skeeters players
Lake Charles Newporters players
Little Rock Travelers players
Major League Baseball first basemen
Meridian Mets players
Milwaukee Brewers (minor league) players
Minor league baseball managers
Minneapolis Millers (baseball) players
Monroe Twins players
Salt Lake City Bees players
New Orleans Pelicans (baseball) players
St. Joseph Drummers players
Winston-Salem Twins players